Air cylinder may refer to:

A gas cylinder used to store compressed air
Pneumatic cylinder, a mechanical device used to impart a force from a fluid, such as air